David Rundqvist (born January 13, 1993) is a Swedish professional ice hockey player, currently playing for Leksands IF in the Swedish Hockey League (SHL).

Rundqvist made his Elitserien debut playing with Färjestad BK during the 2012–13 Elitserien season.

References

External links

1993 births
Living people
Bofors IK players
Djurgårdens IF Hockey players
Frölunda HC players
Leksands IF players
Modo Hockey players
Swedish ice hockey forwards
IF Troja/Ljungby players
Sportspeople from Karlstad